Thomas Anthony Sydes (May 4, 1941 – June 20, 2015) was an American child actor on film and television.

Biography
Sydes was born May 4, 1941, in North Hollywood, California. He was the son of Thomas and Ruth Sydes, and he had a brother, Jonathan, and two sisters, Debbie and Carol.

Sydes made his film debut in Claudia and David (1946). Sydes' last film appearance was in Gunsmoke in Tucson (1958).

After his retirement from acting, Sydes joined the United States Army in 1963, and was stationed in Vietnam, Germany, and Italy. He earned a National Defense Service Medal and a Purple Heart for his 20 years of service.

Sydes founded A&A Auction Gallery in 1980, and became a member of the National Auctioneers Association.

Sydes was married to the former Ann Driscoll. They had two daughters and a son: Elizabeth, Thomas Jr. and Tiffany.  They now have 9 grandchildren: Kaitlyn, Kyle, Mia Berger, Jack, Will, Anna, Gabriel, Adrian, and Noah; and two great-granddaughters.

Sydes died in Springfield, Virginia on June 20, 2015. He was survived by three children, and nine grandchildren.

Filmography

References

External links
 
 
 Arlington National Cemetery
 New York Times filmography

1941 births
2015 deaths
American male television actors
American male film actors
20th-century American male actors
American male child actors
United States Army soldiers
United States Army personnel of the Vietnam War
Male actors from Hollywood, Los Angeles
American auctioneers
Burials at Arlington National Cemetery
North Hollywood High School alumni